Nicolas de la Salle (died 31 December 1710) was the first commissary appointed by the French king in the colony of Louisiana. He was the adversary of Jean-Baptiste Le Moyne de Bienville and eventually responsible for his removal from the office of governor.

La Salle was part of the René-Robert Cavelier, Sieur de La Salle, expedition of 1682, in which all of the Mississippi basin was claimed for France.

He was also the brother-in-law of René-Robert Cavelier, as Nicolas married Robert's sister.

External links 
 

La Salle, Nicolas de
La Salle, N
Year of birth unknown